Byanca Beatriz Alves de Araújo (born 23 November 1995), known as Byanca Brasil or simply Byanca, is a Brazilian footballer who plays as a forward for Cruzeiro.

Club career
Byanca was born in Rio de Janeiro, and represented hometown sides Bangu, Flamengo, Vasco da Gama, America-RJ and Botafogo as a youth. She made her senior debut at the age of 17 with Foz Cataratas, being the team's top goalscorer in the 2013 Campeonato Brasileiro de Futebol Feminino Série A1 with 8 goals.

Byanca moved to Vitória das Tabocas for the 2014 Copa Libertadores Femenina, where she scored once in a 1–3 loss to Cerro Porteño. Subsequently, she rarely settled for a club, representing  Kindermann, Audax (two stints), Centro Olímpico, Corinthians (two stints) and Internacional.

On 5 February 2018, Byanca signed a two-year contract with Chinese club Wuhan Jianghan University. She returned to Brazil on 24 December 2019, and joined Internacional.

On 8 February 2021, Byanca Brasil was presented at Santos. On 10 December, it was announced that she would leave the club after not renewing her contract.

In January 2022, Byanca Brasil joined Palmeiras.

International career
Byanca represented Brazil at under-17 and under-20 levels, and played in the 2012 South American U-17 Women's Championship, 2012 FIFA U-17 Women's World Cup and 2014 FIFA U-20 Women's World Cup.

Honours
Audax
Copa do Brasil de Futebol Feminino: 2016

Corinthians
Copa Libertadores Femenina: 2017

Internacional
: 2017, 2020

Palmeiras
Copa Libertadores Femenina: 2022
Campeonato Paulista de Futebol Feminino: 2022

References

1995 births
Living people
Footballers from Rio de Janeiro (city)
Brazilian footballers
Brazilian women's footballers
Women's association football forwards
Campeonato Brasileiro de Futebol Feminino Série A1 players
Associação Desportiva Centro Olímpico players
Sport Club Corinthians Paulista (women) players
Santos FC (women) players
Sociedade Esportiva Palmeiras (women) players
Chinese Women's Super League players
Expatriate women's footballers in China
Brazilian expatriate women's footballers
Brazilian expatriate sportspeople in China
CR Vasco da Gama (women) players